Barium oxalate (BaC2O4), a barium salt of oxalic acid, is a white odorless powder that is sometimes used as a green pyrotechnic colorant generally in specialized pyrotechnic compositions containing magnesium metal powder. Flame color is rich and vivid without additional chlorine donors. Such compositions burn rate is satisfied without commonly used oxidizers as nitrates, chlorates and perchlorates.

Properties
Though largely stable, barium oxalate can be reactive with strong acids. A mild skin irritant, the substance is considered toxic when ingested, causing nausea, vomiting, kidney failure, and injury to the gastrointestinal tract.

It is different from most pyrotechnic colorants in that it is a reducing agent and not an oxidizing agent. It is extremely insoluble in water and converts to the oxide form when heated.

Preparation
The raw materials that are required to prepare barium oxalate are oxalic acid and barium hydroxide (or its octahydrate).

It can also be prepared by using an oxalic acid solution and a barium chloride solution, with the reaction as follows:

BaCl2 + H2C2O4 → BaC2O4↓ + 2 HCl

References

 rec.pyrotechnics FAQ
 MSDS
 Barium Oxalate
 ChemSpider

Barium compounds
Oxalates
Pyrotechnic colorants